Bertulf may refer to:
Bertulf (archbishop of Trier) (died 883) 
Saint Bertulf of Bobbio, (died 640), German convert to Christianity
Saint Bertulf of Renty, (died 705), German convert to Christianity